Aníbal Álvarez La Pera, known as Aníbal Álvarez (born 25 May 1995) is a Cuban football player. He plays for Ciego de Ávila.

Club career
He made his Cuba national football team debut on 27 February 2019 in a friendly against Bermuda, and scored the fourth goal in a 5–0 victory.

He was later selected for the 2019 CONCACAF Gold Cup squad.

References

External links
 
 

Living people
1995 births
Cuban footballers
Cuba international footballers
Association football midfielders
FC Ciego de Ávila players
FC Santiago de Cuba players
2019 CONCACAF Gold Cup players
People from Ciego de Ávila